René De Smet (17 January 1931 – 15 September 1985) was a Belgian racing cyclist. He rode in the 1953 Tour de France.

References

1931 births
1985 deaths
Belgian male cyclists
Place of birth missing